Local elections for governors, vice governors, mayors and vice mayors in the nation's first elections for provincial and municipal officials since the declaration of martial law were held on January 30, 1980. As usual, President Ferdinand Marcos's party the Kilusang Bagong Lipunan dominated the elections. The Lakas ng Bayan and the Liberal Party-backed National Union for Liberation  did participate but most of them lost except for some like Aquilino Pimentel, Jr. who won the mayoral election in Cagayan de Oro by a landslide.

Results

For Governor

|-
!colspan=2 style="background-color:#E9E9E9;text-align:left;" |Parties and coalitions
! style="background-color:#E9E9E9;text-align:right;" |Posts
|-
| style="text-align:left;" colspan=2 |Kilusang Bagong Lipunan
| style="text-align:right;" |69
|-
| style="text-align:left;" colspan=2 |Other Minor Parties
| style="text-align:right;" |4
|-
|colspan=2 style="text-align:left;background-color:#E9E9E9"|Total
|width="30" style="text-align:right;background-color:#E9E9E9"|73
|-
| style="text-align:left;" colspan=5 |Source: Philippine Commission on Elections
|}

For Mayor

|-
!colspan=2 style="background-color:#E9E9E9;text-align:left;" |Parties and coalitions
! style="background-color:#E9E9E9;text-align:right;" |Posts
|-
| style="text-align:left;" colspan=2 |Kilusang Bagong Lipunan
| style="text-align:right;" |1,550
|-
| style="text-align:left;" colspan=2 |Other Minor Parties
| style="text-align:right;" |3
|-
| style="text-align:left;" colspan=2 |Lakas ng Bayan
| style="text-align:right;" |1
|-
|colspan=2 style="text-align:left;background-color:#E9E9E9"|Total
|width="30" style="text-align:right;background-color:#E9E9E9"|1,554
|-
| style="text-align:left;" colspan=5 |Source: Philippine Commission on Elections
|}

See also
Commission on Elections
Politics of the Philippines
Philippine elections

External links
 Official website of the Commission on Elections

1980
1980 elections in the Philippines